Christine Craig (born 24 June 1943) is a Jamaican writer living in Florida, US. She has published collections of poetry and short stories, as well as children's fiction and several non-fiction works.

Biography
Christine Craig was born in Kingston, Jamaica, and grew up in rural Saint Elizabeth. She received a BA from the University of the West Indies. In 1970, she published her first work, Emanuel and His Parrot, a children's book. She began publishing poetry in the late 1970s and published her first poetry collection, Quadrille for Tigers, in 1984. In 1993, Craig published a collection of short stories entitled Mint Tea. She also researched, wrote and presented a series of stories on Jamaican history for children's television.

Craig tutored English literature at the University of the West Indies and was adjunct professor at Barry University in Florida. In 1989, she took part in the International Writing Program at the University of Iowa. She was editor in Miami for The Jamaica Gleaner from 1990 to 1998. She later moved to Fort Lauderdale, Florida.

Selected works 
 Emanuel and His Parrot (Oxford University Press, 1970)
 Emanuel Goes to Market, children's fiction (Oxford University Press, 1971)
 Sunday in the lane 
 Quadrille for Tigers, poetry (Mina Press, 1984)
 The Bird Gang, children's fiction (Heinemann Caribbean, 1990)
 Guyana at the Crossroads, non-fiction (University of Miami, 1992), with Denis Watson
 Jamaica's National Report to the World Conference on the Environment (1992), co-editor
 Mint Tea and Other Stories (Heinemann, 1993)
 Poems All Things Bright & Quadrille for Tigers (Peepal Tree Press, 2010)

References 

1943 births
Living people
Jamaican women short story writers
Jamaican short story writers
Jamaican women poets
20th-century Jamaican poets
People from Kingston, Jamaica
International Writing Program alumni
Jamaican children's writers
Jamaican women children's writers
20th-century short story writers
20th-century Jamaican women writers